Viliami Makamaile "Willie" Manu (born 20 March 1980) is a former Tonga international rugby league footballer. He played as a second-row forward, he previously played in the National Rugby League for Australian clubs the Wests Tigers, South Sydney Rabbitohs, St. George Illawarra Dragons and the Sydney Roosters. Manu moved to England and played in the Super League for the Castleford Tigers (Heritage № 854), Hull F.C. before joining St Helens (Heritage № 1200), with whom he won the 2014 Super League championship.

Background
Manu was born in Hornsby, New South Wales, Australia.

Playing career
In August 2008, Willie Manu was named in the Tonga training squad for the 2008 Rugby League World Cup, and in October 2008 he was named in the final 24-man Tonga squad. He played for Tonga in 2009 in a Test match against the New Zealand national rugby league team.

St. Helens reached the 2014 Super League Grand Final and Manu was selected to play from the interchange bench in their 14-6 victory over the Wigan Warriors at Old Trafford.

Controversy
In July 2005, Manu was granted continuing bail in Wollongong Local Court on charges related to an altercation at a Wollongong nightclub.  Manu was charged with maliciously inflicting grievous bodily harm and affray.  A nightclub employee suffered head injuries in the incident, while another man received a serious cut to his head.

References

External links
Saints Heritage Society profile

1980 births
Living people
Australian sportspeople of Tongan descent
Australian rugby league players
Castleford Tigers players
Exiles rugby league team players
Hull F.C. players
Rugby league players from Sydney
Rugby league second-rows
South Sydney Rabbitohs players
St Helens R.F.C. players
St. George Illawarra Dragons players
Sydney Roosters players
Tonga national rugby league team players
Wests Tigers players